Rose-Lee Numa (born 1 May 1997) is a Papua New Guinean sailor. She competed at the 2011 Pacific Games,  2015 Pacific Games, winning a silver medal, and  2019 Pacific Games. She qualified at the 2020 Oceania Championship. She also competed in the Laser Radial event at the 2020 Summer Olympics.

References

External links
 

1997 births
Living people
Papua New Guinean female sailors (sport)
Olympic sailors of Papua New Guinea
Sailors at the 2020 Summer Olympics – Laser Radial
Place of birth missing (living people)